1990 McDonald's High School Basketball All-American
Melvin Simon (born April 27, 1971) is an American former professional basketball player. He saw action in four years for the University of New Orleans and was among the US top 20 prep players at Archbishop Shaw High School in Harvey, Louisiana. Scouts said he was the most highly recruited high school player ever to enroll at New Orleans under coach Tim Floyd.

He works as an ELA teacher at Martin Berhman Charter School in Algiers, Louisiana.

Basketball career
As a New Orleans freshman in 1990–91, Simon averaged 11.6 points and 6.6 rebounds and compiled 53 assists and 33 block shots. He started for the varsity which posted a 23-8 mark, losing to Kansas in the first round of the NCAA tournament. Simon was named Louisiana Freshman of the year and turned in the second highest rookie average in 17 years at New Orleans. In the summer after his freshman season, Simon was drafted to play in the US squad that took the Gold medal at the World Junior Championships in Edmonton. Among his teammates were Eddie Stokes, Lance Miller, Jarvis Lang, Bryan Caver, and Jamal Faulkner, The US coach was Lon Kruger.

External links
basketball.realgm.com
www.sportsnola.com

1971 births
American expatriate basketball people in Argentina
American expatriate basketball people in Cyprus
American expatriate basketball people in France
American expatriate basketball people in Iran
American expatriate basketball people in Israel
American expatriate basketball people in the Philippines
American expatriate basketball people in Slovakia
American expatriate basketball people in Spain
American expatriate basketball people in Uruguay
American expatriate basketball people in Venezuela
Basketball players from Louisiana
High school basketball coaches in the United States
New Orleans Privateers men's basketball players
Philippine Basketball Association imports
Living people
American men's basketball players
Sta. Lucia Realtors players
Forwards (basketball)